State Route 376 (SR 376) is a  state highway in Nye and Lander counties in central Nevada, United States. It connects U.S. Route 6 (US 6) near Tonopah north to U.S. Route 50 near Austin.  The Tonopah–Austin Road existed as early as 1919, and was designated the southernmost segment of State Route 8A before being renumbered to SR 376 in 1976.

Route description

The route then curves westward around some mountains to enter the southern end of the Big Smoky Valley. SR 376 continues northeastward through the center of the valley, providing access to Manhattan (via State Route 377) and Round Mountain.

Passing the Round Mountain turnoff, SR 376 shifts to the west edge of Big Smoky Valley, passing through Carvers in the process. The highway passes east of the Arc Dome, the highest point of the Toiyabe Range.

History

Roads linking Tonopah to Austin appear on Nevada maps as early as 1919, although it the exact composition of the route and its highway number was not clearly distinguished. By 1929, a mostly-unimproved route connecting Tonopah to US 50 east of Austin had been clearly established as the southern portion of State Route 8A. This early iteration of the route passed directly through Manhattan and Round Mountain. By 1933, the routing of SR 8A had bypassed the two towns to the west. SR 8A had become a paved highway throughout its entire length by 1950.

State Route 8A remained relatively unchanged for many years after it was paved.  However, the route number was changed in the 1976 renumbering of Nevada's state highways.  The SR 8A designation was eliminated and replaced by State Route 376 on July 1, 1976.  This change was first seen on the 1978–79 version of Nevada's state highway map.  The highway has not been changed since its renumbering.

Major intersections
Note: Mileposts in Nevada reset at county lines. The start and end mileposts for each county are given in the county column.

See also

 Other segments of former State Route 8A:
State Route 140, the northern segment that ran west from U.S. Route 95 via Denio to northwestern Nevada.
State Route 305, the central segment that ran from Austin to Battle Mountain.

References

External links

376
SR 376
Transportation in Lander County, Nevada
Tonopah, Nevada